Botcherby is a former village in Cumbria, England, now considered a suburb of the city of Carlisle. It is located east of the River Petteril south of its confluence with the River Eden, Cumbria.

History
Botcherby was first named in 1170 and became part of Carlisle in 1912. The first reference to "Botcherby" (albeit with a different spelling) was when William Rufus (King William II, 1087–1100) granted a large piece of land around Carlisle to a Flemish mercenary officer called "Bochard" who had served in his
army.
The grant was confirmed by William's successor, Henry I, in a Deed which obliged Bochard to build a castle (not for his own use) in the town, and also to "keep out the Scots and repopulate the district".

At some point in the 16th century the name was anglicized to "Botcherby".

References

External links
 Cumbria County History Trust: Carlisle : St. Cuthbert Without (nb: provisional research only – see Talk page)

See also

List of places in Cumbria

Areas of Carlisle, Cumbria